Symphony of Scorpions is a live album by composer/bassist Graham Collier featuring eponymous composition recorded at Ronnie Scott's Jazz Club in 1976 which was originally released on his own Mosaic label in 1977.

Reception

Allmusic said "At times indulgent, and at others very sparse, the ensemble moves along with excellent focus, drama, and tension, allowing for groupings of smaller units inside the ensemble to carry the motion of this seemingly directionless ramble forward -- all the while honing in on Collier's small-figured place of balance within movement. This is an arduous listen, but is far more successful at sustenance and creative dialogue than New Conditions was, and showcases Collier as having fully embraced the vanguard, and as being very comfortable writing for such a large group".

Track listing
All compositions by Graham Collier.
 "Part 1" - 10:40
 "Part 2" - 7:32
 "Parts 3 & 4" - 13:20
 "Forest Path to the Spring" - 4:10 
Recorded at Ronnie Scott's Jazz Club in London on 7 November 1976 (tracks 1-3 and in Bix, Oxfordshire on 10 March 1977 (track 4

Personnel
Graham Collier – composer, director, bass
Harold Beckett – trumpet (tracks 1–3)
Pete Duncan – trumpet (tracks 1–3)
Henry Lowther – trumpet (tracks 1–3)
Art Themen – tenor saxophone, soprano saxophone
Mike Page – alto saxophone, soprano saxophone (tracks 1–3)
 Tony Roberts – alto saxophone, soprano saxophone (tracks 1–3)
Malcolm Griffiths – trombone (tracks 1–3)
Ed Speight – guitar
Roger Dean – piano (tracks 1–3)
John Webb – drums (tracks 1–3)
John Mitchell – percussion (tracks 1–3)

References

1977 live albums
Graham Collier live albums
Albums recorded at Ronnie Scott's Jazz Club